Tom Hopkins (born 21 December 1992) is a Wales international rugby league footballer who plays as a  forward for the Barrow Raiders in the Betfred Championship.

Background
Hopkins was born in England and is of Welsh descent.

Playing career

Club career
Hopkins played for Askam as an amateur.

He joined the Barrow Raiders ahead of the 2020 season.

International career
Hopkins represented BARLA on tour in 2018.

He made his Wales debut in June 2022 against France at the Stadium Municipal d'Albi in Albi.

In 2022 Hopkins was named in the Wales squad for the 2021 Rugby League World Cup.

References

External links
Barrow Raiders profile
Wales RL profile
Wales profile

1992 births
Living people
Barrow Raiders players
English rugby league players
English people of Welsh descent
Rugby league players from Cumbria
Rugby league second-rows
Wales national rugby league team players